First officer may refer to:

Transportation
 Chief mate, the second-in-command (usually) of a merchant ship
 First officer (aviation) or "co-pilot", the second pilot of a civil aircraft

Military
 Executive officer (military), the second-in-command of a naval vessel
 First officer, the most senior civil service position in the United States Foreign Service
 First officer, a rank in the Air Transport Auxiliary corresponding to Flight Lieutenant in the Royal Air Force
 First officer, a rank in the Women's Royal Naval Service corresponding to Lieutenant-Commander in the Royal Navy